Tijs Velthuis (born 12 January 2002) is a Dutch professional footballer who plays as a centre-back for Eerste Divisie club NAC Breda, on loan from Jong AZ.

Career
Velthuis joined NAC Breda on a season-long loan deal on 13 July 2022, with an option to buy.

Career statistics

Club

Notes

References

External links
 Career stats & Profile - Voetbal International

2002 births
Living people
Dutch footballers
Netherlands youth international footballers
Association football defenders
Quick '20 players
FC Twente players
AZ Alkmaar players
Jong AZ players
NAC Breda players
Eerste Divisie players
21st-century Dutch people